In Greek mythology, Lyssa (Ancient Greek: Λύσσα Lússā), called Lytta (Λύττα Lúttā) by the Athenians, was the spirit of mad rage, frenzy, and rabies in animals. She was closely related to the Maniae, the spirits of madness and insanity. Her Roman equivalent was variously named Ira, Furor, or Rabies. Sometimes she was multiplied into a host of Irae and Furores.

Family
In Euripides' Herakles, Lyssa is identified as "the daughter of Nyx, sprung from the blood of Ouranos"—that is, the blood from Uranus' wound following his castration by Cronus. The 1st-century Latin writer Hyginus lists Ira Lyssa (Lytta) as the Titan daughter of Gaia and Aether (Uranus).

Mythology 
Lyssa personifies mad rage and frenzy, as well as rabies in animals. In Herakles, she is called upon by Hera to inflict the hero Heracles with insanity. In this scenario, she is shown to take a temperate, measured approach to her role, professing "not to use [her powers] in anger against friends, nor [to] have any joy in visiting the homes of men." She counsels Iris, who wishes to carry out Hera's command, against targeting Heracles but, after failing to persuade, bows to the orders of the superior goddess and sends him into a mad rage that causes him to murder his wife and children.

Greek vase paintings of the period indicate Lyssa's involvement in the myth of Aktaion, the hunter torn apart by his own maddened dogs, as a punishment for looking on the naked form of the goddess Artemis. Aeschylus identifies her as being the agent sent by Dionysus to madden the impious daughters of Cadmus, who in turn dismember Pentheus.

Notes

References 
 Euripides, The Complete Greek Drama edited by Whitney J. Oates and Eugene O'Neill, Jr. in two volumes. 1. Heracles, translated by E. P. Coleridge. New York. Random House. 1938. Online version at the Perseus Digital Library.
 Euripides, Euripidis Fabulae. vol. 2. Gilbert Murray. Oxford. Clarendon Press, Oxford. 1913. Greek text available at the Perseus Digital Library.
 Gaius Julius Hyginus, Fabulae from The Myths of Hyginus translated and edited by Mary Grant. University of Kansas Publications in Humanistic Studies. Online version at the Topos Text Project.

External links 
 LYSSA from The Theoi Project

Greek goddesses
Personifications in Greek mythology
Insanity
Rabies
Children of Nyx
Children of Gaia